Kanhaiya Kumar is an Indian political activist who served as the president of the Jawaharlal Nehru University Students' Union and leader of the All India Students Federation (AISF). He served as National Executive Council member of Communist Party of India. He joined Indian National Congress on 28 September 2021.

Early life and education 

Kanhaiya Kumar was born in January 1987, and brought up in the village of Bihat (near Barauni) in Begusarai district, Bihar. The village is part of the Teghra constituency, known to be a stronghold of the CPI. Kumar's father is Jaishankar Singh. His mother, Meena Devi is an Anganwadi worker. He has an elder brother, Manikant, who works as a supervisor with a company in Assam. His family members have traditionally been supporters of the CPI.

Kanhaiya Kumar studied till Class VI at Madhya Vidyalaya, Masnadpur, before joining R. K. C. High School in Barauni. During his school days, Kumar took part in several plays and activities organized by IPTA (Indian People's Theatre Association), a left-leaning cultural group going back to the days of India's freedom struggle. He cleared his Class X board exams in 2002 with a first division. After school, Kumar joined the Ram Ratan Singh College at Mokama, taking up science in Class XI-XII. He then graduated with a degree in geography from the College of Commerce, Arts and Science, Patna in 2007, earning a "first-class".

Political career
While at the Patna College of Commerce, Kumar began getting involved in student politics. He joined the AISF, and a year later was selected as a delegate at its conference in Patna. After completing his post graduation with an MA in sociology from Nalanda Open University in Patna, again securing a first class, he moved to Delhi and after ranking first in the entrance exam in 2011, joined Jawaharlal Nehru University where he pursued a PhD in African studies at the School of International Studies. He completed his PhD in February 2019, titled The Process of Decolonisation and Social Transformation in South Africa, 1994–2015.

In September 2015, Kumar became president of the JNU students' union, representing the AISF.

In March 2016, Kumar stated in an interview, "the first inspiration who made me want to join politics was Bhagat Singh. Then the path continued into Ambedkar, Gandhi and Marx, and also to Birsa Munda and Jyotirao Phule...."

Kumar's autobiography, Bihar to Tihar: My Political Journey was published in October 2016. The book describes his life from his childhood days to his political involvement in Delhi.

On 29 April 2018, he was elected to the party national council of the Communist Party of India (CPI). Later in 2019, he was inducted into CPI national executive council.

2019 Lok Sabha elections
Kumar contested from Begusarai on Communist Party of India's ticket for the 2019 Indian general election. He lost the election, polling a total of  votes and 22.03% of vote share. He secured a distant second position after losing to Giriraj Singh of Bharatiya Janata Party by  votes. About his defeat, he told Aaj Tak in an interview, "I didn't have anything directly to lose in these elections. I got support from the people for fighting against a big, rich and influential machinery and this is a message from democracy that a son of an Anganwadi worker can contest elections."

Elections contested and positions held

Reception
JNU sedition row

In February 2016, Kanhaiya Kumar was arrested by the Delhi Police over the charges of sedition in an event at the JNU campus. It was organised by JNU students to commemorate the second anniversary of the hanging of Parliament attack convict Afzal Guru. Kumar denied shouting any slogans against integrity of the country. Kumar's arrest drew sharp reactions from opposition parties, teachers, students and academics. Students at JNU went on strike to protest his arrest.

Kumar was assaulted on multiple occasions when brought to the Patiala House court for hearings regarding the matter. A Supreme Court-appointed panel later confirmed that the policemen present at the Court were responsible for the security lapses.

On 2 March 2016, Kumar was granted interim bail for 6 months by the Delhi High Court, conditional on an undertaking that he would not "participate in any anti-national activity." Justice Pratibha Rani noted that there were no recordings of Kumar participating in anti-national slogans. A separate magisterial investigation appointed by the Delhi Government concluded that it did not find any evidence of Kumar participating in anti-national slogans.

Following his release from jail, Kumar faced death threats. A leader of the BJP's youth wing offered 5 lakh as a reward to anyone who cut off Kumar's tongue. Posters were put up in New Delhi offering 11 lakh as a reward to anyone who killed Kumar.

 Speech on campus 
On 3 March 2016, Kanhaiya Kumar gave a speech to a packed auditorium in the JNU campus, during which he said he was seeking, not freedom from India, but freedom within India. He appealed to his fellow students to free the nation from the clutches of the Rashtriya Swayamsevak Sangh, which, he stated, was trying to divide the nation. Referring to the Akhil Bharatiya Vidyarthi Parishad, he called them his "opposition", not his enemy. He urged his supporters to keep raising the slogans of Azadi (freedom). The speech won accolades from the leaders of non-BJP parties as well as independent commentators. Shashi Tharoor commented that it turned Kumar into a "nationwide political star," and congratulated BJP for creating this phenomenon. Some people also expressed concern that his speech did not address "the graveness of alleged anti-national slogans" shouted at JNU and what he did to stop them.

 Other incidents and controversies 
On 8 March 2016, speaking at an International Women's Day event, Kumar referred to the rape of Kashmiri women committed by personnel of the Indian Army. This was criticised as being "anti-national" by the Bharatiya Janata Yuva Morcha (BJYM). The BJYM filed a complaint against Kumar and JNU professor Nivedita Menon, alleging them of making "anti-national" statements. A sedition and defamation case was filed against Kumar in a civil court in Patna.

On 10 March 2016, it was revealed that in October 2015, Kumar was fined by the JNU administration for "misbehaving" with a girl student and "threatening" her. Kumar had allegedly been urinating in the open in June 2015 and became abusive and threatened the female student who objected against his behavior. The AISF stated that the case was an attempt to defame Kumar.

On 10 March 2016, Kumar was manhandled and abused on the JNU campus by a man who accused him of being a deshdrohi. This incident came two days after Kumar made a speech on International Women's Day, during which he accused Security personnel for raping woman in Kashmir. However,while addressing students later in the day, Kumar said such incidents couldn't scare him.

On 28 March 2016, Uttar Pradesh Navnirman Sena threatened to storm the JNU campus and gun down Kumar and Umar Khalid unless the two left Delhi by 31 March.

On 29 March 2019, Kumar who was contesting the Lok Sabha polls as a CPI candidate was booked for violation for model code of conduct of elections.

Works
Books
 Bihar To Tihar: My Political JourneyPapers
 The Process of De-colonisation and Social Transformation in South Africa, 1994-2015''

See also 
 Umar Khalid
 Shehla Rashid Shora - Vice president of JNUSU when Kumar was president of the organisation.

References

Further reading

External links 
 
 

1987 births
Living people
Jawaharlal Nehru University alumni
People from Begusarai district
Student politics in India
21st-century Indian politicians
Bihari politicians
Trade unionists from Bihar
Communist Party of India politicians from Bihar
Jawaharlal Nehru University Students' Union
People involved in the Citizenship Amendment Act protests